Sanjay Shete (born 1968) is a professor in statistical genetic, genetic epidemiology, behavioral genetics and biostatistics at The University of Texas MD Anderson Cancer Center. He is Barnhart Family Distinguished Professor in Targeted Therapies and section chief of behavioral and social statistics in the division of Quantitative Sciences.

Shete's ability to design and undertake creative genetic epidemiological studies in collaboration with other scientists is evidenced by the range of genetic investigations of complex disorders in which he has been involved. Shete is currently director of the Biostatistics, Bioinformatics and Systems Biology program at the Graduate School of Biomedical Sciences. Shete has institutional leadership responsibilities as vice-chair of one of the Institutional Review Boards. He was a member of Ethical, Legal and Social Issues Committee and currently a member of the scientific program committee of the International Genetic Epidemiology Society. He was a chartered member of the Cardiovascular and Sleep Epidemiology Study Section for National Institute of Health. He is a fellow of the American Statistical Association. Currently, he is the editor-in-chief of the Genetic Epidemiology journal.

Education 
1987 – B.S., statistics, Shivaji University, Kolhapur, Maharashtra, India
1989 – M.S., statistics, Shivaji University, Kolhapur, Maharashtra, India
1990 – Master of Philosophy, statistics, Shivaji University, Kolhapur, Maharashtra, India
1993 – Research scholar in statistics, Indian Statistical Institute, Calcutta, West Bengal, India
1998 – PhD, statistics, The University of Georgia, Athens, GA

Honors and awards
2014 – Barnhart Family Distinguished Professorship in Targeted Therapies
2014 – Fellow, American Association for the Advancement of Science
2014 – Fellow, Royal Statistical Society
2014 – IGES Leadership Award, International Genetic Epidemiology Society
2014 – Outstanding Service to Graduate Education, UT Graduate School of Biomedical Sciences (GSBS), Houston
2012 – Fellow, American Statistical Association
2011 – Editor-in-chief, Genetic Epidemiology (journal)
2010 – Member, Program Committee of International Genetic Epidemiology Society
2010 – Nominee, Distinguished Faculty Mentor Award
2009 – Nominee, 5th Annual Robert M. Chamberlain Distinguished Mentor Award
2008–2012 – Chartered member, Cardiovascular and Sleep Epidemiology (CASE) Study Section, NHLBI, NIH
2006–2010 – Associate editor, Biometrics
2006–2009 – Member, Ethical, Legal, and Social Issues Committee of International Genetic Epidemiology Society
2006 – Elected member, International Statistical Institute
2004–2005 – President, Houston Area chapter of American Statistical Association

References

External links 
CV
Section of Behavioral and Social Statistics
MD Anderson Quantitative Sciences
Program in Biostatistics, Bioinformatics and Systems Biology
Genetic Epidemiology journal

1968 births
Living people
Statistical geneticists
Indian Statistical Institute alumni
University of Georgia alumni
Fellows of the American Statistical Association
Shivaji University alumni
University of Texas MD Anderson Cancer Center faculty